Hutchins may refer to:

Places
United States
 Hutchins, Georgia, an unincorporated community
 Hutchins, Iowa, an unincorporated community
 Hutchins, Kansas, an unincorporated community
 Hutchins, Texas, a city
 Hutchins, Wisconsin, a town

Other uses
 Hutchins (surname)
 Hutchins Yachts, manufacturers of Com-Pac sailboats

See also
 The Hutchins School, Anglican day and board school for boys, Australia
 Hutchens (disambiguation)
 Hitchens
 Hutchinson (disambiguation)